Afflictions: Culture and Mental Illness in Indonesia is a six-part ethnographic documentary film series on the lives of the mentally ill living on the islands of Bali and Java in Indonesia. Each film documents the personal journey of a patient's diagnosis, care and treatment and the impact of culture, family, and community on the course of their illness. The films were directed and produced by ethnographic filmmaker and psychological anthropologist Robert Lemelson.

The films are based on Lemelson's ethnographic research from 1997 to 2010 on the relationship of psychiatric and neuropsychiatric disorders to culture. It is the first film series on mental illness in the developing world. Some emerging themes include: attitudes of family members, the power of culture in mental health outcomes, the merits of pharmaceutical treatment, and the importance of cultural context in understanding the experiences of the mentally ill.

Films

Book 
Afflictions: Steps Toward a Visual Psychological Anthropology  discusses and complements the work presented in Afflictions: Culture and Mental Illness in Indonesia in order to explore issues in the cross-cultural study of mental illness and advocate for the unique role film can play both in the discipline and in participants’ lives. It integrates psychological and medical anthropology with the methodologies of visual anthropology, specifically ethnographic film. Through ethnographically rich and self-reflexive discussions of the films, their production, and their impact, the book at once provides theoretical and practical guidance, encouragement, and caveats for students and others who may want to make such films.

See also 
 Health in Indonesia

References

External links
 Afflictions: Culture & Mental Illness in Indonesia (official website)
 Afflictions: Culture & Mental Illness in Indonesia - Volume 1: Psychotic Disorders (IMDB)
 Afflictions: Culture & Mental Illness in Indonesia - Volume 2: Neuropsychiatric Disorders (IMDB)
 Elemental Productions (official website)

Documentary films about mental disorders
Documentary films about Indonesia
Health in Indonesia
Indonesian documentary films